Global (formerly Global Taxi Aéreo) is a Brazilian airline specialising in air charter and aircraft maintenance. Its main base is in São Paulo at Congonhas Airport

Fleet 

The Global fleet includes

 Falcon 2000LX EASy
 1 Embraer Legacy 600 (as of August 2016)
 Citation X
 Citation Sovereign
 Citation Excel
 Citation Jet 2
 Phenom 100
 Citation Jet 1
 Citation Mustang
 British Aerospace BAe 125-800
 Pilatus PC 12
 Agusta Grand
 Agusta Power
 Bell 430
 Bell 230
 Esquilo 350 B

References

External links 
GLOBAL TAXI AÉREO
Website of the Successor Airlines Icon Aviation

Airlines of Brazil
Airlines established in 1994
1994 establishments in Brazil